Mon Tresor City is an upcoming project city unveiled by Omnicane in the south west region, more precisely in Plaine Magnien, of Mauritius. It is currently under construction and will have a land area of about 400 hectares. Approximately 5000 jobs are expected to be created by the company. It is one among the "smart cities" announced in the 2015 Budget in the beginning of the year.

Populated places in Mauritius